The 2000–01 Barys Astana season was the 2nd season of the franchise.

Kazakhstan Hockey Championship
Source: PassionHockey.com

Standings

References

Barys Astana seasons
Barys
Barys